Guarea convergens is a species of plant in the family Meliaceae. It is endemic to Brazil.  It is threatened by habitat loss.

References

convergens
Flora of Brazil
Vulnerable plants
Taxonomy articles created by Polbot